The 1896 Colorado gubernatorial election was held on November 3, 1896. Democratic nominee Alva Adams defeated People's Party nominee Morton Shelley Bailey with 46.22% of the vote.

General election

Candidates
Major party candidates
Alva Adams, Democratic
G. H. Allen, Republican

Other candidates
Morton Shelley Bailey, People's
Davis Hanson Waite, Independent

Results

References

1896
Colorado
Gubernatorial